The 2020 South Dakota State Jackrabbits football team represented South Dakota State University in the 2020–21 NCAA Division I FCS football season. They were led by 24th-year head coach John Stiegelmeier and played their home games at Dana J. Dykhouse Stadium in Brookings, South Dakota as members of the Missouri Valley Football Conference.

Previous season

The Jackrabbits finished the 2019 season 8–5, 5–3 in MVFC play to finish in a three-way tie for third place. They received an at-large bid to the FCS Playoffs where, after a first round bye, they lost in the second round to Northern Iowa.

Preseason
On May 27, 2020 HERO Sports ranked the Jackrabbits 2nd in their Top 25 poll for the 2020 season. This is SDSU's highest ranking in a preseason poll.

Schedule
South Dakota State had games scheduled against Butler, Nebraska, and Tarleton State, which were later canceled before the start of the 2020 season.

References

South Dakota State
South Dakota State Jackrabbits football seasons
Missouri Valley Football Conference champion seasons
South Dakota State
South Dakota State Jackrabbits football